New Jersey Hills Media Group, formerly known as Recorder Community Newspapers, is a newspaper publisher based in Whippany, New Jersey and is the owner of fourteen community newspapers and fifteen online newspapers. The publisher was founded in 1955, and currently has Elizabeth K. Parker and Stephen W. Parker as co-publishers. The  Corporation for New Jersey Local Media is working to convert New Jersey Hills to nonprofit ownership.

Newspapers published 
Bernardsville News
Chatham Courier
Echoes-Sentinel
Florham Park Eagle
Hanover Eagle
Hunterdon Review
Madison Eagle
Morris NewsBee
Mount Olive Chronicle
Observer-Tribune
Randolph Reporter
Roxbury Register
The Citizen
The Progress

References

External links 

Newspapers published in New Jersey
Hanover Township, New Jersey
Publications established in 1955